The Prince of Headwaiters is a 1927 American silent drama film directed by John Francis Dillon.

Premise
A maitre d' at the Hôtel Ritz Paris finds out his son, wealthy thanks to his mother, might be blackmailed by Mae Morin (played by Lilyan Tashman).

Cast

References

External links

British Film Institute: The Prince of Headwaiters

1927 films
1927 drama films
Silent American drama films
American silent feature films
American black-and-white films
Films directed by John Francis Dillon
Films with screenplays by Jane Murfin
1920s American films